Weira is a municipality in the district Saale-Orla-Kreis, in Thuringia, Germany.

Weira was the birthplace of Richard Müller the socialist and industrial unionist active in the German Revolution of 1918.

References

External links

Municipalities in Thuringia
Saale-Orla-Kreis
Grand Duchy of Saxe-Weimar-Eisenach